The Dean of Coventry is based at Coventry Cathedral in the West Midlands, UK and is the head of the Chapter at the cathedral, which was created in 1918 from the parish church of St Michael. The current dean is John Witcombe.

Prior to appointment of the first dean the function was carried out by a sub-dean or a provost.

List of incumbents

Sub-Deans
1918–1922 William Haighton Chappel
1922–1923 Harry Woollcombe
1924–1929 St Barbe Holland
1929–1931 Cyril Morton (became Provost)

Provosts
1931–1932 Cyril Morton
1933–1958 Richard Howard
1958–1981 Harold Williams
1982–1987 Colin Semper
1988–2000 John Petty

Deans
2000–2000 John Petty (for 9 days)
2000–2001 Stuart Beake (Acting Dean)
2001–2012 John Irvine
2012-2013 Tim Pullen (Acting Dean)
2013–present John Witcombe

Provosts and Deans of Coventry
Lists of English people
Coventry Cathedral